Illugi Gunnarsson (born 26 August 1967) is an Icelandic politician and former member of the Althing. He is the former Minister of Education, Science and Culture.

References

External links 
Biography of Illugi Gunnarsson on the parliament website

Living people
1967 births
Illugi Gunnarsson
Illugi Gunnarsson